Drew Ara Casen (born July 6, 1950) is a top 50 ranked professional bridge player.

He is a native of Forest Hills and was raised in the Lenox Hills neighborhood of Farmingdale which abuts Bethpage State Park golf course, site of the 2002 and 2009 U.S. Open and the 2019 PGA Championship. Casen took full advantage of this and became a winning Long Island golf star in high school until a sports-related injury sidelined him. His paternal grandmother had taught him card games in his early childhood, so he decided to develop his skills in this area so as to remain in competitive pursuits.

He is an accountant by formal training, his former careers being the budget director at NYU Medical School and options trading at the NY Stock Exchange. He is an all-around expert games player and has excelled in such games as bridge, poker, backgammon, golf, and bowling.

Casen is an American Contract Bridge League (ACBL) Grand Life Master and a World Bridge Federation (WBF) World International Master.

Awards
 Herman Trophy 2006

Wins

 North American Bridge Championships (7)
 Baze Senior Knockout Teams (2) 2010, 2018
 Roth Open Swiss Teams (2) 2016, 2018
 North American Swiss Teams (1) 2001
 Jacoby Open Swiss Teams (1) 1992
 Master Mixed Teams (1) 1983
 Other notable wins:
 Cavendish Invitational Teams (1) 2007
 Cavendish Invitational Pairs (1) 1987
 Goldman Pairs (1) 1984

Runners-up
 Rosenblum Cup (1) 1990
 North American Bridge Championships (16)
 Baze Senior Knockout Teams (2) 2011, 2016
 Vanderbilt (3) 1987, 2000, 2005
 Open Board-a-Match Teams (1) 2006
 Men's Board-a-Match Teams (2) 1982, 1988
 North American Swiss Teams (1) 2003
 Jacoby Open Swiss Teams (1) 1990
 North American Men's Swiss Teams (1) 1986
 Mixed Board-a-Match Teams (1) 2006
 Blue Ribbon Pairs (2) 1982, 2006
 Open Pairs I (1) 1993
 IMP Pairs (1) 1990
 United States Bridge Championships (2)
 Open Team Trials (1) 2000
 Senior Team Trials (1) 2008
 Other notable 2nd places:
 Reisinger Knockout Teams (1) 1988
 Cavendish Invitational Pairs (1) 2007

References

External links
 

1950 births
People from Queens, New York
American contract bridge players
American people of Armenian descent
Living people